Østbanen may refer to:

 Østbanen (Denmark), a local railway in Denmark
 Østbanen (Norway), a popular nickname of Oslo East Station, the forerunner of Oslo Central Station

See also 
 Ostbahn (disambiguation)